George Trulock  was an Anglican priest in Ireland during the 19th-century.

Trulock was born in  County Dublin and educated at Trinity College, Dublin. In 1827 he became a Prebendary of  Lecan in Killala Cathedral; and in 1832 of Ballysadare in Achonry Cathedral. He was Archdeacon of Killala  from his collation until his death on 25 September 1847.

Notes

Alumni of Trinity College Dublin
Church of Ireland priests
19th-century Irish Anglican priests
People from County Dublin
1847 deaths
Archdeacons of Killala